Deborah Lucy Hay  is a New Zealand academic. In 2022 she was elected a Fellow of the Royal Society Te Apārangi.

Academic career

After an undergraduate in pharmacology at the University of Sheffield, Hay did a PhD in molecular pharmacology entitled  'Investigation of the calcitonin receptor-like receptor and receptor activity modifying proteins'  at Imperial College London. Hay moved to the University of Auckland, where she rose to full professor. She is now a full professor at the University of Otago and is a Fellow of the British Pharmacological Society.

Her research involves molecular pharmacological techniques to investigate phenomenon such as migraines.

In 2022, Hay was elected a Fellow of the Royal Society Te Apārangi. The society said "Professor Debbie Hay is an innovative molecular pharmacologist whose seminal contributions have enhanced understanding of the roles of G protein-coupled receptors (GPCRs) in conditions such as migraine, diabetes and obesity... ...she has established herself as a world leader in a complex field, in high demand internationally as a collaborator, speaker, writer and consultant to industry."

Selected works 
 Bailey RJ, Walker CS, Ferner AH, Loomes KM, Prijic G, Halim A, Whiting L, Phillips AR, Hay DL. "Pharmacological characterization of rat amylin receptors: implications for the identification of amylin receptor subtypes." Br J Pharmacol 2012 May;166(1):151-67.
 Bailey RJ, Hay DL. "Agonist-dependent consequences of proline to alanine substitution in the transmembrane helices of the calcitonin receptor." Br J Pharmacol. 2007 Jul;151(5):678-87.
 Dakin, C. L., I. Gunn, C. J. Small, C. M. B. Edwards, D. L. Hay, D. M. Smith, M. A. Ghatei, and S. R. Bloom. "Oxyntomodulin inhibits food intake in the rat." Endocrinology 142, no. 10 (2001): 4244–4250.
 Hay, Debbie L., David R. Poyner, and Patrick M. Sexton. "GPCR modulation by RAMPs." Pharmacology & Therapeutics 109, no. 1 (2006): 173–197.
 Hay, Debbie L., George Christopoulos, Arthur Christopoulos, David R. Poyner, and Patrick M. Sexton. "Pharmacological discrimination of calcitonin receptor: receptor activity-modifying protein complexes." Molecular Pharmacology 67, no. 5 (2005): 1655–1665.
 Hay, Debbie L., Stephen G. Howitt, Alex C. Conner, Marcus Schindler, David M. Smith, and David R. Poyner. "CL/RAMP2 and CL/RAMP3 produce pharmacologically distinct adrenomedullin receptors: a comparison of effects of adrenomedullin22–52, CGRP8–37 and BIBN4096BS." British Journal of Pharmacology 140, no. 3 (2003): 477–486.
 Walker, Christopher S., Alex C. Conner, David R. Poyner, and Debbie L. Hay. "Regulation of signal transduction by calcitonin gene-related peptide receptors." Trends in Pharmacological Sciences 31, no. 10 (2010): 476–483.

References

External links
 
 
 academia
 institutional homepage

Living people
New Zealand women academics
Alumni of Imperial College London
Alumni of the University of Sheffield
Academic staff of the University of Auckland
New Zealand pharmacologists
Year of birth missing (living people)
New Zealand women writers
Fellows of the British Pharmacological Society
Fellows of the Royal Society of New Zealand